Karl Adolf Clarence Hammar (23 June 1899 – 31 December 1989) was a Swedish sailor who competed in the 1924 Summer Olympics and in the 1928 Summer Olympics.

In 1924 he finished sixth in the Olympic Monotype. Four years later he was a crew member of the Swedish boat Sylvia which won the bronze medal in the 8 metre class.

References

External links
 

1899 births
1989 deaths
Swedish male sailors (sport)
Olympic sailors of Sweden
Olympic bronze medalists for Sweden
Olympic medalists in sailing
Sailors at the 1924 Summer Olympics – Monotype
Sailors at the 1928 Summer Olympics – 8 Metre
Medalists at the 1928 Summer Olympics
20th-century Swedish people